Rafael Santana (born 1 December 1944) is a Venezuelan footballer. He played in eight matches for the Venezuela national football team from 1967 to 1979. He was also part of Venezuela's squad for the 1967 South American Championship.

References

1944 births
Living people
Venezuelan footballers
Venezuela international footballers
Place of birth missing (living people)
Association football midfielders
Venezuelan football managers
Trujillanos FC managers
Asociación Civil Deportivo Lara managers
Venezuela national baseball team managers
Caracas FC managers
Carabobo F.C. managers
Deportivo La Guaira managers
Metropolitanos F.C. managers
Estudiantes de Mérida managers
Aragua F.C. managers
UA Maracaibo managers
Deportivo Miranda F.C. managers